The Tandragee Idol is a small granite carving dated to c. 2500–3000 BC, found in a bog near Tandragee, County Armagh, Northern Ireland. It consists of the torso and head of a brutish-looking figure resting on a stone slab. He has a vulgar and course mouth, wears a horned helmet and holds his right arm with his left. At a height of  the idols is about a third below life-sized, and was probably produced for a shrine. It may depict the legendary Tuatha Dé Danann chieftain Nuadha, who successfully lead an invasion of Ireland against the then dominant Fir Bolg.

The statue is kept in the north aisle of the Church of Ireland St Patrick's Cathedral, Armagh town. It is the best known of a number of Iron Age carved stone-head idols found in County Armagh, a number of which are in the crypt of St Patrick's. It is often associated with an earlier double-sided Janisform head from Boa Island, County Fermanagh, which given its similarly dislocated arm is also though to represent Nuadha.

Description
The figure is brutish-looking and squat. Although identifiable as male he appears as rather sexless. He seems to lack a neck and wears a horned helmet.

It has a grotesque face and body, in particular a vulgar wide and gaping mouth reminiscent of the first millennium AD Sheela na gig style. The figure has pierced nostrils, large oval eyes with heavy drooping lids and a primitive heavily ridged brow. Each hand consists of four crudely drawn and oversized fingers that lack knuckles or thumbs.

The figure is carved in the round (that is it can be seen from all sides) from a block of local granite. The torso is positioned on a wide rectangular stone block.

Dating and function
Like the later Corleck Head, the Tandragee Idol may have produced for a small shrine or cult centre.

Most archeologists associate the figure with Nuadha, the mythical chieftain of the Tuatha Dé Danann, who according to the Annals of the Four Masters lived between 1890–1870 BC.  According to folklore, Nuadha lost an arm in battle, a mutilation that threatened his position as a leader, given it made him "not whole of body". By ledged the healer Dian Cecht made a silver false-arm for him; hence the connection to the Tandragee figure, who seems to cling to a detached left arm.

However the archeologist Patrick Gleeson warns against such interpretations and the tendency to view prehistoric Irish stone-deities through a pan-Celtic lens, noting how such labels "are often plucked from later texts to explain the function and symbolism of items like the Corleck Head or Tandragee Idol, much as ethnic labels have been used to explain material phenomena regarded as Romano-British."

The Tandragee Idol is sometimes compared to a c. 400–800 AD double-headed stone figure in the early-Medieval cemetery on Boa Island,  County Fermanagh, given both have seeming detached arms, leading to speculation that both represent Nuadha.

Provenance
It was found in a bog near Tandragee, County Armagh, Northern Ireland, and was at the rectory in Ballymore until at least 1932.

References

Sources

 Gleeson, Patrick. "Reframing the first millennium AD in Ireland: archaeology, history, landscape." Proceedings of the Royal Irish Academy, volume 122C, August 2022 
 Kelly, Eamonn.  "The Iron Age". In Ó Floinn, Raghnall; Wallace, Patrick (eds). Treasures of the National Museum of Ireland: Irish Antiquities. Dublin: National Museum of Ireland, 2002. 
 Kelly, Eamonn. "Treasures of Ireland: Catalogue entries, Late Bronze Age and Iron Age Antiquities". Treasures of Ireland: Irish Art 3000 BC – 1500 AD. Dublin: Royal Irish Academy, 1983
 Porter, Kingsley. "A Sculpture at Tandragee". The Burlington Magazine for Connoisseurs, volume 65, no. 380, 1934. 
 Ross, Anne. "The Human Head in Insular Pagan Celtic Religion". Proceedings of the Society of Antiquaries of Scotland. Volume 91, 1958
 Rynne, Etienn. "Celtic Stone Idols in Ireland". In: Thomas, Charles. The Iron Age in the Irish Sea province. London: Council for British Archaeology, 1972
 Waddell, J. The prehistoric archaeology of Ireland. Galway: Galway University Press, 1998. 
 Warner, Richard. "Two pagan idols - remarkable new discoveries". Archaeology Ireland, volume 17, no. 1, 2003

External links
 St. Patrick's Cathedral 

Celtic stone heads
Irish art
Prehistoric Ireland
Stone objects
Tuatha Dé Danann